North Carolina FC is an American professional soccer team in Cary, North Carolina, a suburb of Raleigh. Founded in 2006, the team plays in USL League One, the third tier of the American league system.

The team has played its home games at the 10,000-seat WakeMed Soccer Park since 2007. The team's colors are Atlantic blue, cardinal red, and Southern gold. 

On December 6, 2016, the Carolina RailHawks announced a name change to North Carolina Football Club in pursuit of becoming a Major League Soccer franchise. The club's home attendance record had been broken earlier that year when 10,125 attended a match against West Ham United of the English Premier League.

History

Club formation and play in the USL first division 
The expansion of the USL to Cary, North Carolina, was announced on January 26, 2006, at a press conference at SAS Soccer Park, since renamed WakeMed Soccer Park. After a few changes in the 2008 off-season, the RailHawks ownership group consisted of Wellman Family Limited partnership (Selby and Brian Wellman), HTCFC. INC (Bob Young former CEO of Red Hat, presently founder and CEO of LULU.com), Singh Holdings (Dr. H. Paul Singh) and Boris Jerkunica. After the 2010 season, Traffic Sports USA took ownership.

On October 11, 2006, former Rochester Rhinos defender Scott Schweitzer was named the first head coach of the RailHawks. Schweitzer played collegiately at North Carolina State University and retired from play prior to the 2006 season. On December 5, 2006, the RailHawks named the first players to sign with the franchise. Among the signings were two former UNC Tar Heel players, Chris Carrieri and Caleb Norkus, as well as several other players with Major League Soccer, United Soccer Leagues, and foreign playing experience.

The club launched their inaugural season on April 21, 2007, in front of a crowd of 6,327 at SAS Soccer Park when they drew 1–1 with the Minnesota Thunder in their first official regular season match. Midfielder Kupono Low scored the first goal in franchise history when he blasted a 24-yard left-footed shot past Thunder keeper Joe Warren in the 8th minute of the inaugural match. On May 8, 2007, the RailHawks earned their first franchise victory 2–0 against Chivas USA in an exhibition match.

On August 14, 2007, with a 3–0 victory over the Charleston Battery, the RailHawks secured their first piece of silverware, the 2007 Southern Derby Cup, with one match remaining in the contest. The RailHawks finished their first USL-1 season in 8th place in the league table, securing the league's final playoff spot on the last day of the regular season with a 2–0 victory away over fellow expansion franchise the California Victory. The RailHawks were eliminated from the playoff quarterfinals by the eventual league champion Seattle Sounders.

Move to the NASL 
In November 2009 the RailHawks announced their intent to leave the USL First Division to become the co-founders of a new North American Soccer League, which would begin play in 2010. The league, which had yet to be sanctioned by the United States Soccer Federation or the Canadian Soccer Association, also comprised the Atlanta Silverbacks, Crystal Palace Baltimore, Miami FC, Minnesota Thunder, Montreal Impact, Tampa Bay Rowdies, Vancouver Whitecaps and a brand new team led by St. Louis Soccer United.

After lawsuits were filed and heated press statements exchanged, the USSF declared they would sanction neither league for the coming year, and ordered both to work together on a plan to temporarily allow their teams to play a 2010 season. The interim solution was announced on January 7, 2010 with the USSF running the new USSF D-2 league comprising clubs from both USL-1 and NASL. The RailHawks reached the final of the USSF D-2 playoffs, but fell to the Puerto Rico Islanders. After the 2010 season, the NASL and USL split, but the RailHawks faced sale by Selby Wellman on December 31, 2010. The RailHawks name was sold on eBay and was purchased by Traffic Sports USA, who assumed operations of the club. The NASL received provisional sanctioning in 2011 and full sanctioning in 2012.

The RailHawks won the regular season in 2011 but fell to the NSC Minnesota Stars in the semifinals of playoffs. The club hired Colin Clarke as coach after Martin Rennie left for the Vancouver Whitecaps.  In 2012, the RailHawks finished 4th in the regular season and fell to the Tampa Bay Rowdies in the playoff semifinals, while reaching the fourth round of the US Open Cup.

In 2013 the NASL's format changed to a split season, and though the RailHawks finished with the most points in the league, they finished 2nd in both the Spring and Fall seasons and did not make the Soccer Bowl. However, they defeated MLS teams LA Galaxy and Chivas USA to advance to the quarterfinals of the US Open Cup. In 2014, the RailHawks again defeated Chivas USA and Los Angeles Galaxy to reach quarterfinals of the US Open Cup, but fell just short of reaching the NASL playoffs.

In 2015, the club saw a change in ownership as local owner Steve Malik took over the team from Traffic Sports. During a press conference on October 30, 2015, the ambitious local owner said, “Our goal is to take the RailHawks to the highest level through additional investment in marketing, players and staffing. We are excited to lead our community in working together to give the Triangle a world-class soccer team.”

New faces in the front office were matched with the new faces on the field. The RailHawks had a big year in 2016 with the addition of forwards Omar Bravo and Matt Fondy. Bravo, the biggest signing in club history, provided senior leadership and immense experience to the team, as he left C.D. Guadalajara as the team's all-time leading scorer. Though the RailHawks missed the playoffs again, with a 7W-5D-10L record, they again made an impressive Open Cup run, reaching the fourth round where they lost a tight 1–0 game to the New England Revolution of MLS. In the third round, the RailHawks eliminated the Charlotte Independence with a 5–0 win that saw Carolina score five extra-time goals in the thrilling match. The score set a US Open Cup record for the most goals scored by a single team in extra time.

Also in 2016, West Ham United became the first Premier League team to visit the Triangle region of North Carolina when they came to WakeMed Soccer Park on July 12, 2016. The game ended in a 2–2 draw in front of a record-breaking crowd of 10,125.

Return to the USL 
On November 16, 2017, the club announced it would be leaving the NASL to join the USL for the 2018 season. The club announced, on October 17, 2018, that head coach Colin Clarke would not be returning to the club after seven seasons and that the club has begun searching for a new head coach.

Dave Sarachan, the former U.S. Men's National Team coach, was named as the fourth head coach in club history on December 17, 2018. They clinched a spot in the USL Championship Playoffs on September 30, 2019.

Drop to USL League One 
On January 10, 2021, club chairman Stephen Malik announced that the club would make a "strategic move" to USL League One, the third-division of the United States soccer league system. Along with the move to USL League One, coach Dave Sarachan and North Carolina parted ways.

Colors and badge

The North Carolina FC badge features elements from the flag of North Carolina. The lower right point of the star represents the Research Triangle, a geographical region that includes Chapel Hill, Durham, and Raleigh. The initials "FC" (Football Club) lies between two airplane wings, alluding to North Carolina's official slogan: "First in Flight." NCFC's primary colors include "Atlantic blue", "cardinal red", and "Southern gold".

Sponsorship

Stadium

 WakeMed Soccer Park; Cary, North Carolina (2007–present)

North Carolina FC play their home games at Sahlen's Stadium at WakeMed Soccer Park (formerly known as SAS Soccer Park), a soccer-specific stadium shared by the North Carolina Courage, a team in the National Women's Soccer League also owned by Stephen Malik.

The soccer complex consists of a purpose-built main stadium, two lighted practice fields, and four additional fields. The main stadium and the 2 lighted fields (2 & 3) are all FIFA international regulation size (120 yards x 75 yards). The main stadium seats 10,000 with the expansions of 2012. Field 2 also has 1,000 permanent bleacher seats.

The park is on  that the State of North Carolina has leased to Wake County. Money to build the soccer park came from $14.5 million in county-wide hotel room and prepared food and beverage taxes. The Town of Cary assumed responsibility for operations and maintenance in 2004 from the then Capital Area Soccer League, now North Carolina FC Youth. On January 26, 2006, the Town of Cary council amended its lease to allow it to sublet the property to Triangle Professional Soccer through the year 2011 for the exclusive promotion of professional soccer and lacrosse events at the complex. This deal was extended for the new ownership group through 2014.

On December 6, 2016, along with a name change, North Carolina FC announced plans for a stadium seating 24,000.

On July 13, 2018, the Daily Commercial News reported that the team is planning a $750 million stadium complex.

Sahlen Packing Company acquired naming rights to the main stadium at WakeMed Soccer Park on March 31, 2017, thus becoming Sahlen's Stadium. Sahlen's will pay $400,000 over five years for the rights, with $100,000 going to the town of Cary and the rest to the North Carolina Courage organization.

Club culture

Rivalries

Charleston Battery and Atlanta Silverbacks
Upon entering the USL First Division, the RailHawks also joined the Southern Derby, renewing a rivalry first started in 2000 between supporters of the Charleston Battery, Atlanta Silverbacks, and the Raleigh Express. By winning the Southern Derby Cup in their inaugural season, the RailHawks became the first Triangle-area team to hold the Cup since 2000 when Raleigh won the cup 3–1–0 over the Silverbacks and Battery in the Derby's first season.

The rivalry between the three clubs was further fueled by the fact that former RailHawks coach Scott Schweitzer earned a reputation among Battery supporters as the defender they loved to hate during his time as a player for Rochester Rhinos and current Atlanta Silverbacks owner Boris Jerkunica had a partial ownership stake in the RailHawks franchise.

With North Carolina FC moving to the USL for the 2018 season, old rivalries with Charleston, Charlotte Independence, and Richmond Kickers will be reborn, along with potential new geographical rivalries with expansion clubs Nashville SC and Atlanta United 2.

Rochester Rhinos
A rivalry developed between the RailHawks and Rochester Rhinos due to the close financial and player ties between the two organizations. Former RailHawks GM Chris Economides held the same position with the Rhinos before departing for Cary, and former Rhinos President Frank DuRoss and former CEO Steve Donner were part of the original ownership group. In addition, former RailHawks coach Scott Schweitzer was a captain and fan favorite of the Rhinos, and onetime RailHawks players Frank Sanfilippo and Connally Edozien were once Rhinos players. This rivalry has cooled ever since the two teams joined different leagues.

Puerto Rico Islanders
The Carolina RailHawks and Puerto Rico Islanders had a rivalry brewing among the two clubs. Although Islanders supporters were not pleased when the RailHawks revealed orange and blue kit colors (selected because the combination is not used by any other Triangle area sports teams, although coincidentally the same colors sported by the Islanders), the rivalry begun in earnest when Islanders President Andrés Guillemard-Noble accused the RailHawks of piracy in the signing of Islanders' free agent Caleb Norkus. While the club executive insists that the Islanders had a verbal agreement with Norkus to return to Puerto Rico for the 2007 season, the player refutes that accusation, saying the two sides never reached terms and cites the lack of an offered written contract as evidence of their lack of agreement. This rivalry has died since the Islanders ceased operations.

Supporters
North Carolina FC has two independent supporter groups, the Oak City Supporters and Triangle Soccer Fanatics.

Players and staff

Roster

Staff
 
  John Bradford  – head coach
  Nic Platter – goalkeeping coach & assistant general manager
  Wilton Baskett  – head athletic trainer

Notable former players
See also All-time North Carolina FC roster

Head coaches
  Scott Schweitzer (2007–2008)
  Martin Rennie (2009–2011)
  Colin Clarke (2012–2018)
  Dave Sarachan (2019–2020)
  John Bradford (2021–present)

Achievements
North American Soccer League
Winners (Supporters Cup) (2): 2011, 2013
USL First Division
Runner-up (Regular Season) (1): 2009
USSF Division 2 Professional League
Runner-up (Playoffs) (1): 2010
Winners, NASL Conference (1): 2010
Minor Trophies
Copa Tecate (1): 2009
Southern Derby (3): 2007, 2008, 2009, 2018

Record

Year-by-year

This is a partial list of the last five seasons completed by the club. For the full season-by-season history, see List of North Carolina FC seasons.

1. Avg. attendance include statistics from league matches only.
2. Top goalscorer(s) includes all goals scored in league play, playoffs, U.S. Open Cup, and other competitive matches.

References

External links
 

 
Association football clubs established in 2006
Sports in Raleigh-Durham
Soccer clubs in North Carolina
USL First Division teams
North American Soccer League teams
2006 establishments in North Carolina
USL Championship teams
Sports in Wake County, North Carolina